Nenad Maksić (born 21 August 1972) is a Serbian handball coach and former player.

Club career
After spending two seasons with Crvena zvezda (1993–1995), Maksić moved abroad to Slovenia. He would play for Prevent Slovenj Gradec (10 seasons in two spells; 1995–2002 and 2003–2006) and Celje (one season; 2002–03). In 2006, Maksić returned to Crvena zvezda, helping the club win the Serbian Handball Super League in its inaugural 2006–07 season.

International career
Maksić represented Serbia and Montenegro (known as FR Yugoslavia until 2003) in six major international tournaments, winning two bronze medals at the World Championships (1999 and 2001).

Honours
Crvena zvezda
 Serbian Handball Super League: 2006–07, 2007–08
 Handball Cup of FR Yugoslavia: 1994–95
Celje
 Slovenian First League: 2002–03
Partizan
 Serbian Handball Super League: 2010–11, 2011–12
 Serbian Handball Cup: 2011–12, 2012–13
 Serbian Handball Super Cup: 2011, 2012

References

External links
 

1972 births
Living people
Sportspeople from Smederevo
Serbian male handball players
Yugoslav male handball players
RK Borac Banja Luka players
RK Crvena zvezda players
RK Partizan players
Expatriate handball players
Serbia and Montenegro expatriate sportspeople in Slovenia
Serbian handball coaches
Serbian expatriate sportspeople in Qatar